Buffalo Mountain Natural Area Preserve is a  Natural Area Preserve in Floyd County, Virginia.

Description
Buffalo Mountain Natural Area Preserve covers the summit and slopes of Buffalo Mountain, a  peak in southwest Virginia. It is open to the public and includes a small parking area from which an approximately  trail may be traversed to reach the summit.

The treeless summit is home to rare plant species including three-toothed cinquefoil (Sibbaldia tridentata) and Rocky Mountain woodsia (Woodsia scopulina); other rare plants, such as bog bluegrass (Poa paludigena) and large-leaved grass-of-Parnassus (Parnassia grandifolia), are found at seeps along the mountain's base. In total, the preserve protects thirteen rare plant occurrences, three rare animal occurrences, and six significant natural communities. Buffalo Mountain is also the only place in the world where the mealybug Puto kosztarabi is known to live.

See also
 List of Virginia Natural Area Preserves

References

External links
Virginia Department of Conservation and Recreation: Buffalo Mountain Natural Area Preserve

Virginia Natural Area Preserves
Protected areas of Floyd County, Virginia